Earnshaw Books is a Hong Kong-based publishing house specializing in English-language books about China. Earnshaw Books was founded in 2007 by CEO Graham Earnshaw. First concentrating in reprinting old Chinese classics, Earnshaw Books has expanded to include original works covering topics on Chinese history and contemporary culture.

History 

In 1996, Graham Earnshaw developed the Tales of Old China website as an information portal about Chinese culture and history. He established Earnshaw Books in 2007 to bring Chinese and Asia interest books to English speakers, hoping to foster cross-cultural dialogue with China and the global community. In the time since, Earnshaw Books has published more than 150 titles which are currently distributed around the world.

In May 2011, the company entered the North American market with distribution partner Independent Publishers Group (IPG)/River North Editions.

The company released Décadence Mandchoue in April 2011. This is an autobiographical memoir of Sir Edmund Backhouse  and contains controversial material covering Backhouse's life in China.

References

External links
 Earnshaw Books - official website
 Graham Earnshaw- Graham Earnshaw's website 
 Tales of Old China
 Graham Earnshaw, Founder of Earnshaw Books at British Council (China)

Publishing companies of Hong Kong
Publishing companies established in 2007
Chinese companies established in 2007
Book publishing companies of China